Hyvinkään Palloseura (abbreviated HyPS) is a football club from Hyvinkää, Finland. The club was formed in 1947 and its main home ground is at the Hyvinkään Urheilupuisto.

History
HyPS played four seasons in the Suomensarja (Finland League), the second tier of Finnish football in 1949, 1951, 1954 and 1965.  They also have had three spells covering 19 seasons in the third tier, the Kakkonen (Second Division), in 1975–77, 1987 and 1995–2009. It was a huge disappointment when they were relegated back to the Kolmonen (Third Division) at the end of the 2009 campaign after 15 consecutive years in the Kakkonen.

HyPS have had a number of outstanding players but none surpass Pertti Jantunen who played a record 327 games for the club scoring 174 goals.	One of the highlights of Hyvinkää football in the 1970s and 1980s were the derby matches with local rivals, Palloiluseura Apollo, who have sadly dropped to the Vitonen in recent years.

Season to season

Club Structure
Hyvinkään Palloseura run a large number of teams including 2 men's teams, 2 ladies teams, 12 boys teams and 6 girls teams.  The Club organises diverse activities for its young players including the popular Euroliiga (Euro League).  The club is one of the largest in Finland with around 1,600 footballers

2010 season
HyPS Men's Team are competing in Section 3 (Lohko 3) of the Kolmonen administered by the Helsinki SPL and Uusimaa SPL.  This is the fourth highest tier in the Finnish football system.  In 2009 HyPS finished in 13th place in Group A of the Kakkonen.

HyPS 02 are participating in Section 2 (Lohko 2) of the Nelonen administered by the Uusimaa SPL. In 2009 they were promoted from Section 4 of the Vitonen.

References and sources
Official Website
Finnish Wikipedia
Suomen Cup

Footnotes

Football clubs in Finland
Hyvinkää
1947 establishments in Finland